Yoest is a surname. Notable people with the surname include:

Bill Yoest (born 1951), American football player
Charmaine Yoest (born 1964), American writer and commentator

See also
Yost (surname)